Alfredo José Isaac Cecilio Francesco Méndez-Gonzalez  (June 3, 1907 – January 28, 1995) was an American Catholic bishop who served in Puerto Rico and who later became involved with sedevacantists.

Biography

Early life
Alfredo Méndez-Gonzalez was born in Chicago, Illinois, United States, on June 3, 1907, of mixed Spanish and Puerto Rican ancestry. On June 23, he was baptized as "Alfredo José Isaac Cecilio". He took the name "Francesco" at his confirmation.

As a boy of about nine years old, he was tapped on the head by Saint Frances Xavier Cabrini, an elderly nun who came to the Mendez home to thank Mendez's mother for her work in supporting Catholic charities. Méndez said afterward that it was at that moment that he was tapped on the head by Cabrini that he knew he would become a priest. Méndez harbored a great devotion to her for the rest of his life.

Education

He attended school in New York, United States, and in Barcelona, Spain, and finished high school in Evansville, Indiana, United States. In 1925, he entered the postulancy of the Congregation of the Holy Cross at Holy Cross seminary at the University of Notre Dame, Notre Dame, Indiana, and made his novitiate there in 1926 at Saint Joseph's Novitiate. In 1931, he graduated from the University of Notre Dame. He performed his theological studies at Holy Cross College of Catholic University of America in Washington, D.C.

Priesthood

On June 24, 1935, in Washington, D.C., Méndez was ordained a priest. He then returned to the University of Notre Dame for graduate studies.

In 1926, his religious superiors sent him to teach at St. Edward's University in Austin, Texas. As a priest in Austin, he devoted himself to Mexican immigrants (the Catholic Church in Mexico was suffering persecution during this time). He established parishes and built churches for them during the late 1930s and early 1940s.

in 1948. Later that year, he was transferred to the University of Notre Dame to assume administrative positions in there. In 1956, his religious superiors named him the first Director of Province Development for the Congregation of the Holy Cross.

Episcopacy

On July 23, 1960, Pope John XXIII named Méndez the first bishop of Arecibo, Puerto Rico. He traveled to Rome for the Second Vatican Council, but soon, he and several others fell ill with hepatitis, but he sufficiently recovered to be able to return and attend the council's closing days. He is said to have been shocked upon his return and stated: "They're all Protestants!" On the other hand, it is also said that he stated that his big contribution to the council was his effort for a married diaconate.

On January 21, 1974, at the age of 66, after only 14 years of active service as a diocesan bishop, he resigned as Bishop of Arecibo and returned to California. Numerous diocesan bishops in the United States invited him to assist in their dioceses, but Méndez refused such invitations.

From his retirement, he had steady correspondence with the Vatican and with other bishops, urging the return of the traditional Latin Mass. He is said to have offered the traditional Latin Mass daily in his private chapel, but is also said to have used the 1967 Missal. He never took a public stand against the Second Vatican Council and the Mass of Paul VI, is not known to have offered the Tridentine Mass in public at a traditionalist chapel after the promulgation of the Mass of Paul VI, and is criticized by some as a non-traditionalist. At some time, he favored the idea of a separate "Traditional Latin Rite" with independent status similar to the Eastern Catholic rites, but abandoned that idea as unworkable. He then recommended and entertained the notion of some sort of Tridentine Ordinariate which, like the U.S. Military Ordinariate, would be independent of bishops throughout the world, but eventually judged that idea to be also unworkable.

He supported Archbishop Marcel Lefebvre of the Society of Saint Pius X (SSPX). Méndez friendship with and admiration for him dated back to 1961, when some of Lefebvre's Holy Ghost Priests were in Méndez's Diocese of Arecibo. Méndez wrote to the Vatican defending Lefebvre, who was criticized by the Vatican. In return, Giovanni Benelli from the Vatican defended the Vatican's criticism of Lefebvre, stating that Lefebvre rejects Paul VI and the Second Vatican Council. On the other hand, Lefebvre thanked Méndez for his help and "courageous intervention to [the] Holy See."

In 1988, in California, Méndez was visited by Paul Baumberger and Joseph Greenwell, two former seminarians of the Society of Saint Pius X (SSPX) who were then associated with the Society of Saint Pius V (SSPV), about the possibility of future priestly ordinations. Méndez encouraged them to find an active bishop who would ordain them. He attempted to help them, though all his efforts were in vain. On April 25, 1990, Méndez asked Bishop Juan Fremiot Torres Oliver to supply a "canonical cover" (in Oliver's expression) for traditionalist priests. Oliver rejected his proposal. In July 1990, after two years of attempts to negotiate a regular ordination for Baumberger and Greenwell with some as yet active bishop, Méndez decided that he himself will ordain them without the ordinary authorizations. The ordinations to the diaconate occurred on August 1, 1990, and with about four dozen people present, including five priests, the ordinations to the priesthood occurred on September 3.

Méndez was a prominent, avid, and financial supporter of the television program "What Catholics Believe" of Father Clarence Kelly and Father William Jenkins (both priests of the SSPV). Méndez even invited Pat Buchanan to be a guest in the show.

On September 8, 1993, Méndez was visited by Kelly and Jenkins to be asked about the possibility of consecrating a bishop, but before Kelly and Jenkins had a chance to ask him, Méndez himself proposed to Kelly to consecrate him a bishop. They discussed the question of excommunication at some length and talked about an interview with canon lawyer Count Neri Capponi that appeared in the May–June 1993 issue of The Latin Mass magazine, where Capponi expressed the view that Archbishop Lefebvre was not really excommunicated for the Écône consecrations. Méndez gave the whole matter further consideration. He then became ill and suffered pneumonia. He was rushed into the critical care unit (CCU). Jenkins arrived at the hospital in Vista, California, and administered the Sacrament of Extreme Unction and gave the Apostolic Benediction to Méndez, who then gradually but swiftly improved and recovered.

On October 19, 1993, in his private chapel in his home in Carlsbad, California, Méndez consecrated Kelly a bishop, in secret and without papal permission.

Death

In January 1995, the priests of the SSPV brought Méndez to Cincinnati to show him a church property they hoped he would buy for them. During the stay, Méndez became ill, suffered pancreatic tumor, and went into hospital. He died on January 28, 1995, at the age of 87.

At that week, Mendez's consecration of Kelly in 1993 was announced by the SSPV.

References

External links 
 

1907 births
1995 deaths
20th-century Roman Catholic bishops in Puerto Rico
American people of Puerto Rican descent
American people of Spanish descent
American Roman Catholic priests
Congregation of Holy Cross bishops
Participants in the Second Vatican Council
University of Notre Dame alumni
Roman Catholic bishops of Arecibo